Sophene (or ) was a province of the ancient kingdom of Armenia, located in the south-west of the kingdom, and of the Roman Empire. The region lies in what is now southeastern Turkey.

The region that was to become Sophene was part of the kingdom of Ararat (Urartu) in the 8th-7th centuries BC. After unifying the region with his kingdom in the early 8th century BC, king Argishtis I of Urartu resettled many of its inhabitants in his newly built city of Erebuni (modern day Armenian capital Yerevan). Around 600 BC, Sophene became part of the newly emerged ancient Armenian Kingdom of the Orontids. This dynasty acted as satraps of Armenia first under the Median Empire, later under the Achaemenid Empire.

After Alexander the Great's campaigns in 330s BC and the subsequent collapse of the Achaemenid Empire, Sophene remained part of the newly independent kingdom of Greater Armenia. In the early 3rd century BC, at the instigation of the Seleucid Empire, which was trying to weaken the Armenian kingdom, Sophene, split from Greater Armenia, forming the Kingdom of Sophene. The kingdom was ruled by a branch of the Armenian royal dynasty of Orontids. Sophene later split from the Sophene-Commagene kingdom as well, forming an independent kingdom. Commagene was part of Sophene at this time.

Around 200 BC, in his attempt to finally subjugate Armenia, Seleucid king Antiochus III conquered both Greater Armenia and Sophene, installing Armenian generals Artaxias I (Artashes) and Zariadres (Zareh) as governors-strategoi in the respective kingdoms. Following Antiochus' defeat by the Romans at the Battle of Magnesia in 190 BC, both Zariadres and Artaxias declared themselves independent kings. Zariadres and his descendants ruled the Kingdom of Sophene until it was reunified with Greater Armenia by Tigranes the Great in the 80s BC. Branches of the Orontid dynasty continued to rule parts of Sophene after it was annexed by Greater Armenia. 

Cyril Toumanoff identifies Sophene as the domain of one of the four bdeshkhs of the Kingdom of Armenia. The bdeshkhs were high-ranking nobles responsible for defending the borders of the Kingdom of Armenia.

Sophene was detached by Rome from Greater Armenia several times. Pompey gave Sophene to Tigranes the Younger in 66 BCE after defeating his father Tigranes the Great, then transferred it to Ariobarzanes I of Cappadocia.
Around 54, the Romans installed Sohaemus of Emesa as King of Sophene. After this, Sophene reverted to Armenian control, but definitively came under Roman control again in 298. Sophene eventually became a province of the Roman Empire. Its capital was Amida (modern Diyarbakır). In 530, Sophene was included into the province of Armenia IV.

The local Armenian population remained until the Armenian genocide of 1915.

See also 
Kingdom of Sophene
Degik

References

 
Roman provinces in Asia
States and territories established in the 3rd century BC
90 BC
1st-century BC disestablishments
Provinces of the Kingdom of Armenia (antiquity)
Near East in classical antiquity